SS Supetar was a Yugoslavian Cargo ship that was torpedoed and sunk by the  on 12 June 1942 in the Indian Ocean,  south of Beira, Mozambique.

Construction 
Supetar was built at the William Gray & Co. Ltd. shipyard in West Hartlepool, County Durham, North East England in 1909. Where she was launched and completed that same year. The ship could reach a maximum speed of 8.5 knots.

Sinking 
All crew on board at the time of the sinking survived.

References

1909 ships
Ships sunk by Japanese submarines
Cargo ships of Yugoslavia
Ships sunk with no fatalities
Maritime incidents in June 1942
World War II shipwrecks in the Indian Ocean